Bretton Woods can refer to:

Bretton Woods, New Hampshire, a village in the United States
Bretton Woods Mountain Resort, a ski resort located in Bretton Woods, New Hampshire
The 1944 Bretton Woods Conference, also known as the "United Nations Monetary and Financial Conference"
The Bretton Woods system, the international monetary system created at the 1944 Bretton Woods Conference

See also
Brenton Wood, American soul singer
Breton Woods, New Jersey, an unincorporated community in the United States